Matej Hamrák (born October 14, 1987) is a Slovak professional ice hockey forward playing for Sangliers Arvernes de Clermont of the FFHG Division 1.

Hamrák previously played thirteen games for HC Vítkovice of the Czech Extraliga during the 2006–07 season. He also played in the Tipsport Liga for HK Spišská Nová Ves, HC '05 Banská Bystrica, HK Nitra and ŠHK 37 Piešťany.

Since 2015, Hamrák has played in France, beginning with Aigles de Nice where he spent three seasons until 2018. He then signed for Cosaires de Nantes and played two seasons there before joining Sangliers Arvernes de Clermont on July 7, 2020.

References

External links

1987 births
Living people
Les Aigles de Nice players
HC '05 Banská Bystrica players
HC Havířov players
HK Nitra players
Sportspeople from Spišská Nová Ves
ŠHK 37 Piešťany players
Slovak ice hockey forwards
HK Spišská Nová Ves players
HC Vítkovice players
Slovak expatriate ice hockey players in the Czech Republic
Slovak expatriate sportspeople in France
Expatriate ice hockey players in France